The 2003 Ogun State gubernatorial election occurred in Nigeria on April 19, 2003. The PDP nominee Gbenga Daniel won the election, defeating Olusegun Osoba of the AD.

Gbenga Daniel emerged PDP candidate. He picked Falinat Badru as his running mate. Olusegun Osoba was the AD candidate with Sefiu Adegbenga Kaka as his running mate.

Electoral system
The Governor of Ogun State is elected using the plurality voting system.

Primary election

PDP primary
The PDP primary election was won by Gbenga Daniel. He picked Falinat Badru as his running mate.

AD primary
The AD primary election was won by Olusegun Osoba. He picked Sefiu Adegbenga Kaka as his running mate.

Results
A total number of 11 candidates registered with the Independent National Electoral Commission to contest in the election.

The total number of registered voters in the state was 1,576,875. Total number of votes cast was 747,296, while number of valid votes was 701,375. Rejected votes were 45,921.

References 

Ogun State gubernatorial elections
Ogun State gubernatorial election
Ogun State gubernatorial election
Ogun State gubernatorial election